Kahriz (also Romanized as Kahrīz; also known as Karez) is a village in Khararud Rural District, in the Central District of Khodabandeh County, Zanjan Province, Iran. At the 2006 census, its population was 210, in 52 families.

References 

Populated places in Khodabandeh County